Manuel de Borba Gato (1649–1718) was a bandeirante in Colonial Brazil. He began his career with his father-in-law Fernão Dias Pais. When he died in 1718 he held the office of Juiz ordinário of the town of Sabará. It is not known where he is buried, perhaps in the Capela de Santo Antônio or the Capela de Santana in the old town of Sabará, or even, according to various writers, in Paraopeba where he had an estate. Beyond being a discoverer of mines, he was an effective administrator at the end of his life.

References

1649 births
1718 deaths
Brazilian explorers